The 2010 Clydesdale Bank 40 tournament was the inaugural ECB 40 limited overs cricket competition for the English and Welsh first-class counties. In addition to the 18 counties, Scotland and the Netherlands took part, as well as the Unicorns, a team of players who did not have first-class contracts.

The competition consisted of three groups of seven teams, from which the top team from each group, plus the best second-placed team, progressed to the semi-finals.

Fixtures and results

Group stage

Group A

Group B

Group C

Knockout stage

Semi-finals

Final

See also
 ECB 40
 Friends Provident Trophy
 Pro40

References

ECB 40
Clydesdale Bank 40
2010 in English cricket